Hiram Eduardo Muñoz Cantú (born 26 May 1995) is a Mexican professional footballer who plays for Sinaloa.

Career

Youth
Muñoz first started his career in 2010 with Club Calor. He then briefly moved to Monterrey Youth Academy in 2012 until finally settling in Club Tijuana's youth academy in 2014. After he continued through Club Tijuana Youth Academy successfully going through U-20 and Club Tijuana Premier. He eventually broke thorough to the first team, Miguel Herrera being the coach that called him up.

Club Tijuana
On April 1, 2017, Muñoz made his professional debut in the Liga MX against Club Atlas which ended in a 3–3 draw.

References

External links

Hiram Muñoz at XOLO Profile

1995 births
Living people
Association football defenders
Club Tijuana footballers
Dorados de Sinaloa footballers
Liga MX players
Ascenso MX players
Liga Premier de México players
Tercera División de México players
Footballers from Coahuila
Mexican footballers
Sportspeople from Torreón